Adrian Byran Murrell (born October 16, 1970) is a former professional American football running back.  He was drafted by the New York Jets in the fifth round of the 1993 NFL Draft after playing collegiately for the West Virginia Mountaineers.  Murrell played in nine National Football League (NFL) seasons from 1993 to 2000 and 2003.

High school
Murrell attended Leilehua High School in Wahiawa, Hawaii.

Collegiate career
Murrell arrived at West Virginia University in 1990, when Michael Beasley started for the Mountaineers. The Mountaineers went 4-7 that season, with Murrell only seeing limited time. He only rushed for 48 yards on seven attempts that season.

In his sophomore year, 1991, Murrell and the Mountaineers began to increase their product. The Mountaineers went 6-5 that season, while Murrell saw the starting role. He rushed for 904 yards and seven touchdowns on the year, with an added 100 receiving yards.

In his final season as a Mountaineer, his junior year of 1992, Murrell produced the best season of his college career. While the Mountaineers sunk back, going 5-4-2, Murrell made national headlines. He rushed for 1,145 yards and six touchdowns, along with 244 receiving yards and three receiving touchdowns.

Murrell is a member of Alpha Phi Alpha fraternity.

Professional career

New York Jets
Murrell left West Virginia after his junior season, and was drafted in the fifth round of the 1993 NFL Draft by the New York Jets.  In his first two seasons as a Jet, Murrell rushed for a total of 317 yards and a touchdown.

In 1995, Murrell began to break out as a player.  He rushed for 795 yards on the season, along with a touchdown.  He also added 495 yards and two touchdowns receiving.  The following year, 1996, Murrell posted his best performance of his professional career.  He rushed for 1,249 yards (4th in AFC, 7th in NFL) and six touchdowns that season, along with a receiving touchdown.

In 1997, Murrell recorded 1,086 yards rushing with seven touchdowns and caught two receiving touchdowns.

Arizona Cardinals
Following the 1997 season, Murrell was traded to the Arizona Cardinals.  Murrell gained 1,042 yards and eight touchdowns in 1998 playing in all 16 games.  He went on to rush for 95 yards and catch 2 passes for 16 yards and a touchdown in the Cardinals 20-7 Wildcard playoff win over the Dallas Cowboys, a team that had beaten Arizona twice in the regular season.  This was Arizona's first postseason win since 1947.  In 1999, he only rushed for 553 yards, but caught 49 passes for 335 yards.

Washington Redskins
Following the Arizona stint, Murrell arrived in Washington with the Redskins for the 2000 season. But Murrell only saw limited action during the season, and recorded 50 rushing yards.

Carolina Panthers
Murrell was signed by the Carolina Panthers in the 2001 offseason to serve in a backup role, but was cut before the season began to make room for Richard Huntley on the active roster.

Dallas Cowboys
After a two-year break from the NFL, Murrell returned in 2003 to play for the Dallas Cowboys.  In Murrell's final professional season, he recorded 107 yards rushing.

Personal life
His younger brother, Marques Murrell, was a defensive end on the Appalachian State University football team.  He signed a contract with the New York Jets on November 7, 2007.
His father, a career soldier, was a Command Sergeants Major at the time of his draft. Stationed at Ft. Bragg. Married to Tonia Peck Murrell. They have three children.

References

External links

 

1970 births
Living people
American football running backs
Arizona Cardinals players
Dallas Cowboys players
New York Jets players
Washington Redskins players
West Virginia Mountaineers football players
Sportspeople from Fayetteville, North Carolina
People from Honolulu County, Hawaii
Players of American football from Hawaii
African-American players of American football
21st-century African-American sportspeople
20th-century African-American sportspeople